Neottia bifolia (syn. Listera australis), common name southern twayblade, is a species of terrestrial orchid found in eastern Canada (from Nova Scotia to Ontario) and the eastern United States (from Florida west to eastern Texas and north to Vermont).

References

External links
US Department of Agriculture plants profile, Listera australis Lindl. southern twayblade
Go Orchids, North American Orchid Conservation Center,  Neottia bifolia (Raf.) ined. Southern Twayblade
Go Botany, New England Wild Flower Society, Neottia bifolia, southern twayblade
Florida's Native and Naturalized Orchids, Southern Twayblade (Listera australis)

bifolia
Plants described in 1808
Orchids of North America
Flora of Eastern Canada
Flora of the Eastern United States